Jeremiah Joseph Holland (24 November 1955 – 13 November 2022) was an Irish rugby union player and coach.

Life and career
Born in Cork, Holland played for Munster and won three caps for Ireland between 1981 and 1986, before transitioning into coaching, becoming Munster's head coach for three seasons from 1994–95 until 1996–97, overseeing the provinces transition from an amateur to professional side and their first fixtures in the Heineken Cup. In his time as head coach, Munster won the IRFU Interprovincial Championship twice, in 1994–95 and 1996–97, and won all of their home Heineken Cup games. Ahead of the 1997–98 season, all four Irish provinces were to appoint full-time directors of coaching, but Holland chose not to apply for the role. Instead, Holland became part of Munster's coaching staff under new head coach John Bevan, as well as becoming Ireland A's manager for the 1998–99 season, before becoming Munster manager from 2000 until 2007. After rugby, Holland worked for EBS, one of Ireland's largest financial institutions. His son, Billy, is also a rugby player, winning over 200 caps for Munster and one cap for Ireland in 2016. He died on 13 November 2022, at the age of 66.

Honours (as coach)

Munster
IRFU Interprovincial Championship
Winner (2): 1994–95, 1996–97

References

External links
Ireland Profile
ESPN Scrum Profile

1955 births
2022 deaths
Rugby union players from County Cork
Irish rugby union players
University College Cork RFC players
Cork Constitution players
Munster Rugby players
Leinster Rugby players
Ireland international rugby union players
Munster Rugby non-playing staff
Rugby union locks